Akbar Saghiri (born 27 June 1982) is an Iranian footballer who plays as a striker for Mes Rafsanjan in the Azadegan League.

Club career
He was one of the top scorers in Azadegan League for Petrochimi and moved to Persepolis in June 2009.

Club career statistics

External links
Persian League Profile

1982 births
Living people
Sportspeople from Tehran
Iranian footballers
Association football forwards
Niroye Zamini players
Petrochimi Tabriz F.C. players
Persepolis F.C. players
Naft Tehran F.C. players
Machine Sazi F.C. players
Rah Ahan players
Nassaji Mazandaran players
Aluminium Hormozgan F.C. players
Sanat Naft Abadan F.C. players
Mes Rafsanjan players
Azadegan League players